The Volvo B10R is a rear-engined bus chassis manufactured by Volvo between 1978 and 1992. It was as its predecessor, the B59, aimed as a citybus chassis, and was succeeded by the B10B in 1992.

The B10Rs were bodied mainly by Aabenraa for Denmark, by Säffle and Aabenraa for Sweden by Arna, Säffle, by Hess in Switzerland, by Camo, Salvador Caetano and Irmãos Mota in Portugal and VBK for Norway.

In Australia, a few B10Rs were operated by Busways, Hornibrook Bus Lines and Surfside Buslines.

References

External links

Bus chassis
Vehicles introduced in 1978
B10R